The Roman Catholic Diocese of Tyler is a Latin Church ecclesiastical territory, or diocese, of the Catholic Church in eastern Texas in the United States. The episcopal see is Tyler, and the Cathedral of the Immaculate Conception in Tyler is its mother church. 

The Diocese of Tyler is a suffragan diocese in the ecclesiastical province of the metropolitan Archdiocese of Galveston-Houston.

History

1690 to 1986 
The first Catholic mission in Texas, then part of the Spanish Empire, was San Francisco de los Tejas. It was founded by Franciscan Father Damián Massanet in 1690 in the Weches area. The priests left the mission after three years, then established a second mission, Nuestro Padre San Francisco de los Tejas. near present day Alto in 1716.

In 1839, after the 1836 founding of the Texas Republic, Pope Gregory XVI erected the prefecture apostolic of Texas, covering its present day area.  By the 1840's, missionaries were visiting Clarksville and Nacogdoches.  The prefecture was elevated to a vicariate apostolic in 1846, the year that Texas became an American state. On May 4, 1847, Pope Pius IX elevated the vicariate into the Diocese of Galveston. Marshall received its first missionary visit in 1853. The Tyler area would remain part of several Texas dioceses for the next 139 years.

1986 to present 
Pope John Paul II founded the Diocese of Tyler on December 12, 1986 and erected on February 24, 1987. He appointed Reverend Charles Herzig of the Diocese of Galveston-Houston as its first bishop. Herzig died in 1991.  In 1992, John Paul II appointed Auxiliary Bishop Edmond Carmody as bishop of Tyler. The pope named Carmondy as bishop of the Diocese of Corpus Christi in 2000.

Auxiliary Bishop Álvaro Corrada del Río from the Archdiocese of Washington was named bishop of Tyler by John Paul II in 2001.  Pope Benedict XVI appointed del Rio as bishop of the Diocese of Mayagüez in 2011. 

The current bishop of the Diocese of Tyler is Joseph Strickland of the Diocese of Dallas, appointed by Benedict XVI in 2011. Strickland is the first native East Texan to head the diocese.

Bishops

Bishops of Tyler
Charles Edwin Herzig (1986–1991)
Edmond Carmody (1992–2000), appointed Bishop of Corpus Christi
Álvaro Corrada del Río, S.J. (2000–2011), appointed Bishop of Mayagüez in Puerto Rico
Joseph E. Strickland (2012–present)

Other diocesan priest who became bishop
Eduardo Alanis Nevares, appointed Auxiliary Bishop of Phoenix in 2010

Geography
The Diocese of Tyler comprises the following 33 counties in east and northeast Texas: 

Anderson, Angelina, Bowie, Camp, Cass, Cherokee, Delta, Franklin, Freestone, Gregg, Harrison, Henderson, Hopkins, Houston, Lamar, Leon, Madison, Marion, Morris, Nacogdoches, Panola, Rains, Red River, Rusk, Sabine, San Augustine, Shelby, Smith, Titus, Trinity, Upshur, Van Zandt, and Wood.

The parishes are grouped into six deaneries for administrative purposes: Northwest, West Central, Southwest, Northeast, Southeast, East Central.

Education

High schools 
Bishop T. K. Gorman High School, Tyler
St. Mary's Catholic School, Longview

See also

 Catholic Church by country
 Catholic Church in the United States
 Ecclesiastical Province of Galveston-Houston
 Global organisation of the Catholic Church
 List of Roman Catholic archdioceses (by country and continent)
 List of Roman Catholic dioceses (alphabetical) (including archdioceses)
 List of Roman Catholic dioceses (structured view) (including archdioceses)
 List of the Catholic dioceses of the United States

References

External links 
Roman Catholic Diocese of Tyler Official Site

 
Tyler
Christian organizations established in 1986
Tyler, Texas
Tyler
Tyler
1986 establishments in Texas